Zeoke is a village situated in Lazarevac municipality in Serbia. It is considered a part of the Belgrade-Metropolitan area.

References

Populated places in Serbia
Lazarevac